Christopher Todd Beck (born June 21, 1966) is a retired United States Navy SEAL who gained public attention in 2013 after coming out as a trans woman, and in 2022, when he announced his detransition. During the time of his transition, he went by the name Kristin Beck. A memoir detailing his experience was published in June 2013, Warrior Princess: A U.S. Navy SEAL's Journey to Coming out Transgender. He served in the U.S. Navy for twenty years. In December 2022, Beck announced that he had detransitioned because "it ruined my life".

Early life and education 
Beck grew up on a farm. As early as the age of five, he was drawn to feminine clothes and toys, but was encouraged to adopt masculine roles by his parents. Before transitioning, he married twice and has two sons from his first marriage. He recounts in his memoir how his gender dysphoria contributed to his inability to emotionally mature while being in a male body, adding conflict to his sexual identity, although he never really felt gay. Additionally, his duties as a U.S. Navy SEAL kept him on missions away from home, which distanced him from family members. Before enlisting in the United States Navy, Beck attended Virginia Military Institute from 1984 through 1987.

Career

United States Navy
Beck served for 20 years in the U.S. Navy SEALs before his transition, taking part in 13 deployments, including seven combat deployments. Beck completed Basic Underwater Demolition/SEAL (BUD/S) training with class 179 in 1991 and subsequently served with SEAL Team One. Following SEAL Tactical Training (STT) and completion of six month probationary period, Beck received the Navy Enlisted Classification (NEC) 5326 as a Combatant Swimmer (SEAL), entitled to wear the Special Warfare Insignia. Beck eventually served as a member of the United States Naval Special Warfare Development Group (also known as DEVGRU), a special counter-terrorism unit popularly called SEAL Team Six, and received multiple military awards and decorations, including a Bronze Star and a Purple Heart. He told Anderson Cooper he wanted to be a SEAL because they were the "toughest of the tough".

Beck retired from the Navy in 2011 with final rating as Senior Chief Special Warfare Operator when he began transitioning by dressing as a woman. In 2013, he began hormone therapy, preparing himself for sex reassignment surgery. During an interview with Anderson Cooper in early June 2013, he stated that he never came out during his military career and that "No one ever met the real me". After coming out publicly in 2013 by posting a photo of himself as a woman on LinkedIn, he received a number of messages of support from his former military colleagues.

Warrior Princess 
Beck co-wrote Warrior Princess with Anne Speckhard, a psychologist at the Georgetown University School of Medicine. Speckhard was doing a study on resilience of the U.S. Navy SEALs, that is, the coping mechanisms employed by SEALs to deal with their intense job demands. Speckhard first met Beck at a counter-terrorism conference. After Beck agreed to discuss coping mechanisms, a follow-up meeting took place in a gay bar, with Beck now dressed in feminine attire, to Speckhard's surprise. A five-hour meeting led to Speckhard agreeing to help Beck write his life story.

In the book, Speckhard notes that Beck had a desire to die honorably "so that he wouldn't have to wrestle anymore with the emotional pain that stemmed from the lack of congruency between his gender identity and body". In his introduction to the book, Beck writes:

I do not believe a soul has a gender, but my new path is making my soul complete and happy... I hope my journey sheds some light on the human experience and most importantly helps heal the "socio-religious dogma" of a purely binary gender.

OutServe Magazine praised the book, calling it "one of the smartest and most important books of the year". The Huffington Post noted that while the "don't ask, don't tell" policy was repealed in 2011, the ban on openly transgender people serving in the U.S. armed forces still remained. Days before the release of Warrior Princess, Metro Weekly's Poliglot column reported that the Pentagon had celebrated LGBT Pride Month in a memo while avoiding mention of transgender military personnel; the Pentagon memo read in part: "We recognize gay, lesbian and bisexual service members and LGBT civilians for their dedicated service to our country." The Atlantic Wire said that the book could "lay the groundwork for even greater inclusion in the armed forces" and Salon stated that Beck's military credentials may "lead the Pentagon to revisit its policy against trans service members". While restrictions on sexual orientation were lifted in 2010–2011, restrictions on gender identity remained in place due to Department of Defense regulations until 2016, when the Obama administration ended the ban on transgender Americans serving in the military.

Lady Valor
Lady Valor: The Kristin Beck Story, a documentary, aired on CNN on September 4, 2014. Earlier during LGBT Pride Month on June 18, 2014 at the Defense Intelligence Agency, Beck received a plaque from retired Lieutenant General Michael T. Flynn when he led the DIA as its Director.

Congressional campaign
In August 2015, CNN said that Beck was running for Congress to represent Maryland's 5th congressional district. Beck finished second behind Representative Steny Hoyer in the Democratic primary election on April 26, 2016.

Media appearances
Beck appeared on the Dr. Phil Show in 2015. He has also been interviewed by Anderson Cooper on CNN.

On June 1, 2022, he appeared on an episode of The Joe Rogan Experience podcast. On December 1, 2022, Beck stated in a video interview with Robby Starbuck that he had detransitioned.

Detransition
In December 2022, Beck announced his detransition and said he had "lived in hell for the past 10 years" and that it had been roughly seven years since he last took hormones. Beck has since appeared in the media urging those under 25 not to transition. In an interview he gave with conservative influencer Robby Starbuck, Beck contrasts the "beliefs" of the LGBTQ community with his own belief in Jesus and God and discusses his desire to convert people away from being trans by witnessing his own Christian conversion.

Beck said he was offered hormones within one hour of a meeting at Veterans Affair. He stated that he had "so much going wrong" in his system when he started taking cross-sex hormones.  He also highlighted that it is "a billion dollar industry between psychologists, between surgeries, between hormones, between chemicals, between follow-up treatments" and that there are "thousands of gender clinics popping up all over" America and each one is "going to be pulling in probably over $50 million".

Awards and decorations
    

 Beck has earned five golden service stripes.

See also 
 Transgender personnel in the United States military

References

External links 

 Congressman Alcee L. Hastings recognizing Ms. Kristin Beck for her courage and service to the nation
 Twitter page
 Fashion Magazine article and photographs

United States Navy SEALs personnel
Living people
1966 births
SEAL Team Six personnel
Transgender rights activists
Virginia Military Institute alumni
People who detransitioned